Vary is a surname. Notable people with the name include:

Alec Vary (1908–1977), Australian rules footballer 
Namesake of the William L. Vary House in Livingston County, New York
Richard Vary Campbell (1840–1901), Scottish advocate, sheriff, and legal author 
Ralph Vary Chamberlin (1879–1967), American biologist

See also
Very (disambiguation)